The Florida State League of Minor League Baseball is a Single-A baseball league in the United States. The league was founded in 1919. A league champion is determined at the end of each season. Champions have been determined by postseason playoffs, winning the regular season pennant, or being declared champion by the league office. Off and on (1919–28, 1936–41, and 1946–68), the league recognized pennant winners and/or playoff winners as league champions. In 2019, the first-half and second-half winners in each division (North and South) competed in a best-of-three series to determine division champions. Then, the North and South division winners played a best-of-five series to determine a league champion. Since 1979, the winner of the League Championship Series has become the holder—until the following season's championship—of the Watson Spoelstra Florida State League Championship Trophy. As of 2022, the winners of each division from both the first and second halves of the season meet in a best-of-three division series, with the winners of the two division series meeting in a best-of-three championship series.

Key

League champions
Score and finalist information is only presented when postseason play occurred. The lack of this information indicates a declared league champion.

Championship wins by team
Active Florida State League teams appear in bold.

Notes
 Fort Lauderdale-St. Petersburg had the best record when the league disbanded on July 4.
 The Orlando Twins defeated Miami, 2–1, in the final round of the playoffs, but Miami was awarded the pennant based on best win–loss percentage.
 Brevard County and Tampa were declared co-champions in the wake of the September 11 attacks, which caused a stoppage in professional baseball.
 Daytona and Tampa were declared co-champions due to the threat of Hurricane Ivan.
 Dunedin and Palm Beach were declared co-champions due to the threat of Hurricane Irma.
 Playoffs were cancelled due to the threat of Hurricane Dorian.
 The season was cancelled due to the COVID-19 pandemic

References
General

Specific

Florida State League champions
Florida State League
F
Florida State League